
Gmina Łask is an urban-rural gmina (administrative district) in Łask County, Łódź Voivodeship, in central Poland.

Villages
Apart from the town of Łask, Gmina Łask contains the villages and settlements of Aleksandrówek, Anielin, Bałucz, Borszewice, Budy Stryjewskie, Gorczyn, Grabina, Karszew, Krzucz, Łopatki, Mauryca, Nowe Wrzeszczewice, Okup Mały, Okup Wielki, Orchów, Ostrów, Rembów, Remiszew, Rokitnica, Sięganów, Stryje Księże, Stryje Paskowe, Teodory, Wiewiórczyn, Wola Bałucka, Wola Łaska, Wola Stryjewska, Wronowice, Wrzeszczewice, Wydrzyn and Zielęcice.

Neighbouring gminas
Gmina Łask is bordered by the gminas of Buczek, Dobroń, Lutomiersk, Sędziejowice, Szadek, Wodzierady, Zduńska Wola and Zelów.

References
Polish official population figures 2006

Lask
Łask County